
Harry Chapman may refer to:

Sportsmen
 Harry Chapman (baseball) (1887–1918), American baseball catcher
 Harry Chapman (footballer, born 1880) (1880–1916), English footballer
 Harry Chapman (footballer, born 1997), English footballer

Others
 H. E. Chapman (Harry Ernest Chapman, c. 1871–1944), Chief Constable of Kent, 1921–1940
 Harry Chapman (news anchor), American news anchor